The 1972 Atlanta Braves season was the seventh season in Atlanta along with the 102nd season as a franchise overall.

Offseason 
 December 2, 1971: Hal King was traded by the Braves to the Texas Rangers for Paul Casanova.

Regular season

Notable transactions 
 May 11, 1972: Steve Barber was released by the Braves.
 June 6, 1972: Preston Hanna was drafted by the Braves in the 1st round (11th pick) of the 1972 Major League Baseball Draft.
 June 15, 1972: Jim Nash and Gary Neibauer were traded by the Braves to the Philadelphia Phillies for Andre Thornton and Joe Hoerner.
 June 29, 1972: Orlando Cepeda was traded by the Braves to the Oakland Athletics for Denny McLain.

Front-office and managerial turnover
Richards and Harris were a management team that had worked in tandem for 15 years with the Chicago White Sox, Baltimore Orioles and Houston Astros before coming to the Braves.

Atlanta was 18–22 on June 1 when Richards was demoted from GM to special assignment scout; his replacement was another longtime associate, Eddie Robinson, 51, the director of the club's farm system. Harris was fired August 6, with the Braves standing at 47–57 (.452), in fourth place in the NL West Division and 16 games behind the Cincinnati Reds.  His successor was another internal hire, Eddie Mathews, 40, the team's first-base coach and perennial All-Star third baseman from its glory days in Milwaukee during the 1950s.

Season standings

Record vs. opponents

Roster

Player stats

Batting

Starters by position 
Note: Pos = Position; G = Games played; AB = At bats; H = Hits; Avg. = Batting average; HR = Home runs; RBI = Runs batted in

Other batters 
Note: G = Games played; AB = At bats; H = Hits; Avg. = Batting average; HR = Home runs; RBI = Runs batted in

Pitching

Starting pitchers 
Note: G = Games pitched; IP = Innings pitched; W = Wins; L = Losses; ERA = Earned run average; SO = Strikeouts

Other pitchers 
Note: G = Games pitched; IP = Innings pitched; W = Wins; L = Losses; ERA = Earned run average; SO = Strikeouts

Relief pitchers 
Note: G = Games pitched; W = Wins; L = Losses; SV = Saves; ERA = Earned run average; SO = Strikeouts

Farm system

Notes

References 

1972 Atlanta Braves season at Baseball Reference

Atlanta Braves seasons
Atlanta Braves season
Atlanta